Eremophila mirabilis is a flowering plant in the figwort family, Scrophulariaceae and is endemic to Western Australia. It is a shrub with narrow leaves, brightly coloured sepals and petals growing in two widely separated areas.

Description

The petal tube and lobes are cream-coloured to pale yellow with bright red spots on the outside but not inside. The outer surface of the tube and both surfaces of the lobes are glabrous but there is a band of soft hairs inside the tube. The 4 stamens extend slightly beyond the end of the petal tube.

Taxonomy and naming 
The species was first formally described by Robert Chinnock in 2007 and the description was published in Eremophila and Allied Genera: A Monograph of the Plant Family Myoporaceae. The specific epithet (mirabilis) is a Latin word meaning "wonderful" or " strange".

Distribution and habitat
Eremophila mirabilis occurs in two disjunct locations, one near Niagara and the other north of Mullewa in the Murchison and Yalgoo biogeographic regions. Plants in both areas grow in stony clay on laterite slopes.

Conservation
This species is classified as "Priority Two" by the Western Australian Government Department of Parks and Wildlife meaning that is poorly known and from only one or a few locations.

Use in horticulture
The unusual flower colouring of this eremophila, with spots on the outside of the petal tube, and the long-lasting, large red or yellow sepals makes it a valuable addition to a garden or for a container plant on a patio. It can be propagated from cuttings but these are often slow to strike. A preferred method is grafting onto Myoporum rootstock. This shrub prefers well-drained soil in full sun and although moderately drought tolerant, needs occasional watering in a long drought. It is not frost hardy, so needs to be grown in a sunny part of the garden.

References

Eudicots of Western Australia
mirabilis
Endemic flora of Western Australia
Plants described in 2007
Taxa named by Robert Chinnock